Penmere railway station serves the northern part of Falmouth, Cornwall, England. The station is managed by, and the trains operated by, Great Western Railway.

History
The station was opened by the Great Western Railway on 1 July 1925. Sidings were opened into an oil depot on 1 April 1940 and were closed again on 16 November 1967. In December 2009, an old bridge at the Truro end of the platform was knocked down without warning. In its place, all that remains is the side of the bridge in the right embankment.

Location
There is just one platform with level access from the car park. The station is within walking distance of the top of The Moor, in the centre of the town.

Services
The station is served by two trains each way each hour during weekday daytime, with a reduced service in the evenings and on Sundays.

Community Rail 
The station is well cared for, as it is looked after by the Friends of Penmere Station. The station was shortlisted in the national Best Kept Small Station Award in 2002 and was awarded second prize in the Station Gardens Competition in 2005.

The railway from Truro to Falmouth is designated as a community rail line and is supported by marketing provided by the Devon and Cornwall Rail Partnership. The line is promoted under the "Maritime Line" name.

References

External links

Railway stations in Cornwall
Railway stations in Great Britain opened in 1925
Former Great Western Railway stations
Buildings and structures in Falmouth, Cornwall
Railway stations served by Great Western Railway
DfT Category F1 stations